Emley can refer to one of two small British villages:

Emley, West Yorkshire, the location of the Emley Moor transmitting station
Emley A.F.C., an association football club based in the West Yorkshire village
Emley, Surrey, also known as Bowlhead Green, close to the village of Thursley